Ge Xin'ai (born 1953) is a former female international table tennis player from China.

Table tennis career
From 1975 to 1979 she won several medals in singles, doubles, and team events in the Asian Table Tennis Championships, and in the World Table Tennis Championships.

The nine World Championship medals included five gold medals; one in the singles at the 1979 World Table Tennis Championships, three in the team event and one in the mixed doubles at the 1979 World Table Tennis Championships with Liang Geliang.

See also
 List of table tennis players
 List of World Table Tennis Championships medalists

References

Chinese female table tennis players
Living people
1953 births
Table tennis players from Henan
People from Zhengzhou